C-list may refer to:

 A category of celebrities, originally referring to Hollywood actors; see A-list
 C-list (computer security), a list of capabilities that a process or protection domain has direct permission to access
 CLIST, a procedural programming language